Sarntal is a valley and a comune (municipality) in South Tyrol in northern Italy, located about  north of the city of Bolzano. The municipality comprises several towns and villages. The largest one, seat of the mayor and council, is Sarnthein.

Geography
Sarntal borders the following municipalities: Hafling, Freienfeld, Klausen, Franzensfeste, Mölten, Ratschings, Ritten, Jenesien, St. Leonhard in Passeier, Schenna, Vahrn, Vöran and Villanders. The Durnholzer See is located in the municipal territory.
The main river is the Talfer, which has its source at the Weißhorn mountain in the Pensertal.

History
The village of Sarnthein was first mentioned in 1211.

Coat of arms
The emblem represents an or deer’s head on azure. The insignia looks like that of the various Lords who administered the territory since 1315, but since 1681 they were named Counts of Sarnthein (Grafen von Sarnthein) living in the Kellerburg Castle. The emblem was adopted in 1967.

Society

Linguistic distribution
According to the 2011 census, 98.07% of the population speak German, 1.82% Italian and 0.10% Ladin as first language.

Notable people 
 Franz Thaler (1925 in Sarntal – 2015), an author, a peacock quill embroiderer and a survivor of the concentration camp in Dachau
 Gustav Hofer (Sarntal, 1976), film director, screenwriter, journalist and TV host

References

External links
 Official website 

Municipalities of South Tyrol
Valleys of Italy